Noraishah "Nasha" Abdul Aziz (born 14 May 1971) is a Malaysian model and an actress. She was born in Kampung Pandan, Kuala Lumpur, Malaysia.

Modelling career
Nasha Aziz started her career as a model in 1989. She was introduced to the modelling industry by actress and model Tiara Jacquelina. She continued to build her fame as a model in Malaysia and declined an offer of a New York modelling contract because of religious and cultural factors. She modelled in Hong Kong and London and then branched out into acting.

Nasha was given the title of Malay number one supermodel and an icon. She appeared in commercials for products such as Nescafe Classic, Avon, Pantene and Panasonic.

Presently, Nasha is the face of Avon and Polo Hauss in Malaysia. This is her third year (2010) as the face of fashion giant Polo Ralph Lauren. In a recent interview, Nasha stated that she is more focused on her modelling than acting career for now. She is involved in a few modelling events such as a Bridal Showcase in Penang at the end of May 2010 and followed by an event in Shanghai, China in June 2010.

Acting career
Nasha began her acting career at 24 years old in 1995, starring in a box-office movie, Kad Cinta alongside Hairie Othman as the main leads. The movie was directed and produced by Julie Dahlan. Even so, Nasha was more well-knowned for her modelling than her acting career.

Nasha rose to fame in 1998 after starring in a popular TV Series, Hanya Dikau alongside Rosyam Nor and Hairie Othman. She was also well liked for her character in the Soap Opera, Idaman. In 1998 too, Nasha received an acting offer from Malaysia's number one director, Yusof Haslam to play the character, Effa, a prostitute, in the movie Bara. The role was previously turned down by Malay film primadona, Erra Fazira. The movie proved to be a stepping stone for Nasha when she was nominated in the Best Actress category and won Best New Actress at the 13th Malaysia's Film Festival (FFM13).

Filmography

Film

Television series

Telemovie

Theatre

TV Show & other appearances
 Spring-Summer Zang Toi  New York Fashion Show (2001 - as Runway Model)
 ABPBH  TV3 (2004 - as Award Presenter / Penyampai Anugerah)
 Evening With The Stars  KL Fashion Week (2004 - as Guest Artist & Runway Model)
 Evening With The Stars  KL Fashion Week (2005 - as Guest Artist & Runway Model)
 Anugerah Skrin  TV3 (2006 - as Award Presenter)
 Anugerah Filem Pendek  RTM1 (2007 - as Award Presenter)
 AVON Walk Around The World For Breasts Cancer Awareness Campaign (2008 - as AVON ambassador)
 Anak Wayang  Astro RIA (2009 - as Jury / Juri Tetap)
 The Green Party  The Curve Fashion Week (2010 - as Guest Artist & Model)
 MIFA Gala Night  Malaysia International Fashion Week (2010 - as Guest Artist & Runway Model for Syaiful Baharim)
 CNY Festival  Shanghai Fashion Show (2013 - as Runway Model)
 Fesyenista Manja Baby Kiko (Season 3)  Astro RIA (2014 - as Jury / Juri Tetap)
 Magnum KL Grand Opening  MAGNUM Ice Cream Malaysia (2015 - as Guest Artist)
 Majlis Pelancaran Koleksi Paloma Ezuwan Ismail Collection (2016 - as Guest Artist & Model)
 MeleTOP  Astro RIA & Astro RIA HD (2016 - as Guest Artist)
 Sepahtu Reunion Live  Astro RIA HD & Astro MAYA HD (2017 - as Guest Artist / Cameo)
 Anugerah MeleTOP ERA  Astro RIA & Astro RIA HD (2017 - as Award Presenter)
 Kempen Raya Ekslusif  RizmanRuzaini Collection (2017 - as Guest Artist & Model)
 FFM29 - Malaysia Film Festival  Astro RIA & Astro MAYA HD (2017 - as Award Presenter)
 Ready-to-wear RizmanRuzaini Collection  KL Fashion Week (2017 - as Guest Artist & Runway Model)
 Lefestour Grand Finale Fashion Show  Azhar Zainal Collection (2017 - as Guest Artist & Runway Model)
 AJL Trophy Introduction RizmanRuzaini Special Edition  TV3 (2018 - as Runway Model)
 Gen F  Astro RIA HD (2018 - as Guest Jury / Juri Jemputan)

Magazine cover
 GLAM November Issue (2004)
 GLAM January Issue (2008)
 InTrend February Issue (2008)
 JOMSTAR.com January Issue (2009)
 EH! October Issue (2009)
 GLAM September Issue (2011)
 ENF Entertainment & Fashion (2012)
 WW Fashion September Issue (2013)
 MalayMillennialModern September Issue (2017)
 NONA November Issue (2018)

Awards and nominations

 Pelakon filem Wanita Popular means Famous film actress
 Pelakon TV Wanita Popular means Famous TV actress

 Pelakon Wanita Terbaik means Best actress
 Pelakon Pembantu Wanita Terbaik means Best supporting actress

 Pelakon Wanita Terbaik means Best actress
 Pelakon Harapan Wanita means Promising actress

 Pelakon Pembantu Wanita Terbaik means Best supporting actress

References

External links
 
 
 
 

1971 births
Living people
Malaysian actresses
Malaysian female models
Malaysian Muslims
Malaysian people of Malay descent
Malaysian television personalities
People from Kuala Lumpur